Duncan v McDonald [1997] 3 NZLR 669 is a cited case in New Zealand regarding  the granting of relief under the Illegal Contracts Act 1970 for illegal contracts.

Background
The McDonalds entered into an illegal scheme with some Nigerians that in return of an investment of $285,000, they would receive $2,000,000. The McDonalds borrowed the money from an estate that Mr Duncan, a solicitor, was managing, and they used a property as security for the loan. Duncan was aware of the illegal nature of the transaction when he lent the money.

Unsurprisingly, the McDonalds were a victim of a Nigerian scam, leaving the McDonalds unable to repay the mortgage on their property, and Duncan sought to enforce the mortgage.

The McDonalds sought to have the mortgage set aside, as it was the result of financing of a crime, whilst Duncan sought validation.

Decision
The court ordered validation of the mortgage, but only to the extent of $75,000.

Footnote: This case is similar to Polymer Developments Group Ltd v Tilialo

References

Court of Appeal of New Zealand cases
New Zealand contract case law
1997 in New Zealand law
1997 in case law